The Cerophytidae are a family of beetles belonging to Elateroidea. Larvae are associated with rotting wood, on which they are presumed to feed. The family contains over 20 species in five genera, primarily distributed in the New World, but also in Eurasia and Africa. 17 fossil species in 7 genera are known extending to the Early Jurassic. Like some other elateroids, the adults are capable of clicking.

Taxonomy 
After

Mesozoic clade:

 †Elaterocoleus Dolin 1973 Dzhil Formation, Kyrgyzstan, Early Jurassic (Hettangian-Sinemurian)
 †Praelaterium Dolin 1973  Dzhil Formation, Kyrgyzstan, Hettangian-Sinemurian
 †Necromeropsis Yu et al. 2019 Burmese amber, Myanmar, Late Cretaceous (Cenomanian)
 †Aphytocerus Zherikhin 1977 Taimyr Amber, Russia, Late Cretaceous (Cenomanian-Santonian)
 †Jurassophytum Yu et al. 2019 Jiulongshan Formation, China, Middle Jurassic (Callovian)
 †Necromera Martynov 1926 Jiulongshan Formation, China, Callovian, Karabastau Formation, Kazakhstan, Late Jurassic (Oxfordian) Laiyang Formation, Yixian Formation, China, Early Cretaceous (Aptian)
Extant clade:

 †Wongaroo Oberprieler et al. 2016 Talbragar Fossil Fish Bed, Australia, Late Jurassic (Tithonian)
 †Baissophytum Chang et al. 2011 Zaza Formation, Russia, Aptian
 †Baissopsis Kirejtshuk 2013 Zaza Formation, Russia, Aptian
 †Amberophytum Yu et al. 2019  Burmese amber, Myanmar, Cenomanian
 Genus Afrocerophytum Costa, Vanin et Rosa, 2014
Afrocerophytum vix Costa, Vanin et Rosa, 2014
 Genus Aphytocerus Zherikhin, 1977
Aphytocerus communis Zherikhin, 1977
 Genus Brachycerophytum Costa, Vanin, Lawrence & Ide, 2003
Brachycerophytum sinchona Costa, Vanin, Lawrence & Ide, 2003
 Genus Cerophytum Latreille, 1806
Cerophytum convexicolle LeConte, 1866
Cerophytum japonicum Sasaji, 1999
Cerophytum pulsator (Haldeman, 1845)
 Genus Phytocerum Costa, Vanin, Lawrence & Ide, 2003
Phytocerum alleni Costa, Vanin, Lawrence & Ide, 2003
Phytocerum belloi Costa, Vanin, Lawrence & Ide, 2003
Phytocerum birai Costa, Vanin, Lawrence & Ide, 2003
Phytocerum boliviense (Golbach, 1983)
Phytocerum burakowskii Costa, Vanin, Lawrence & Ide, 2003
Phytocerum cayennense (de Bonvouloir, 1870)
Phytocerum distinguendum (Soares & Peracchi, 1964)
Phytocerum golbachi Costa, Vanin, Lawrence & Ide, 2003
Phytocerum ingens Costa, Vanin, Lawrence & Ide, 2003
Phytocerum inpa Costa, Vanin, Lawrence & Ide, 2003
Phytocerum minutum (Golbach, 1983)
Phytocerum serraticorne Costa, Vanin, Lawrence & Ide, 2003
Phytocerum simonkai Costa, Vanin, Lawrence & Ide, 2003
Phytocerum trinidadense (Golbach, 1983)
Phytocerum zikani (Soares & Peracchi, 1964)

References

External links

Cerophytidae at the Tree of Life

Elateroidea
Beetle families